This page lists all described species of the spider family Caponiidae accepted by the World Spider Catalog :

C

Calponia

Calponia Platnick, 1993
 C. harrisonfordi Platnick, 1993 (type) — USA

Caponia

Caponia Simon, 1887
 C. braunsi Purcell, 1904 — South Africa
 C. capensis Purcell, 1904 — Namibia, Mozambique, South Africa
 C. chelifera Lessert, 1936 — Zimbabwe, Mozambique, South Africa
 C. forficifera Purcell, 1904 — South Africa
 C. hastifera Purcell, 1904 — South Africa, Mozambique
 C. karrooica Purcell, 1904 — South Africa
 C. natalensis (O. Pickard-Cambridge, 1874) (type) — Tanzania, Namibia, Botswana, Mozambique, South Africa
 C. secunda Pocock, 1900 — South Africa
 C. simoni Purcell, 1904 — South Africa
 C. spiralifera Purcell, 1904 — South Africa

Caponina

Caponina Simon, 1892
 C. alegre Platnick, 1994 — Brazil
 C. cajabamba Platnick, 1994 — Peru
 C. chilensis Platnick, 1994 — Chile
 C. chinacota Platnick, 1994 — Colombia
 C. longipes Simon, 1893 — Venezuela
 C. notabilis (Mello-Leitão, 1939) — Brazil, Uruguay, Argentina
 C. papamanga Brescovit & Sánchez-Ruiz, 2013 — Brazil
 C. paramo Platnick, 1994 — Colombia
 C. pelegrina Bryant, 1940 — Cuba
 C. sargi F. O. Pickard-Cambridge, 1899 — Guatemala, Costa Rica
 C. testacea Simon, 1892 (type) — St. Vincent
 C. tijuca Platnick, 1994 — Brazil

Carajas

Carajas Brescovit & Sánchez-Ruiz, 2016
 C. paraua Brescovit & Sánchez-Ruiz, 2016 (type) — Brazil

Cubanops

Cubanops Sánchez-Ruiz, Platnick & Dupérré, 2010
 C. alayoni Sánchez-Ruiz, Platnick & Dupérré, 2010 — Cuba
 C. andersoni Sánchez-Ruiz, Platnick & Dupérré, 2010 — Bahama Is.
 C. armasi Sánchez-Ruiz, Platnick & Dupérré, 2010 — Cuba
 C. bimini Sánchez-Ruiz, Platnick & Dupérré, 2010 — Bahama Is.
 C. darlingtoni (Bryant, 1948) — Hispaniola
 C. granpiedra Sánchez-Ruiz, Platnick & Dupérré, 2010 — Cuba
 C. juragua Sánchez-Ruiz, Platnick & Dupérré, 2010 — Cuba
 C. ludovicorum (Alayón, 1976) (type) — Cuba
 C. luquillo Sánchez-Ruiz, Brescovit & Alayón, 2015 — Puerto Rico
 C. terueli Sánchez-Ruiz, Platnick & Dupérré, 2010 — Cuba
 C. tortuguilla Sánchez-Ruiz, Platnick & Dupérré, 2010 — Cuba
 C. vega Sánchez-Ruiz, Platnick & Dupérré, 2010 — Hispaniola

D

Diploglena

Diploglena Purcell, 1904
 D. arida Haddad, 2015 — Namibia, South Africa
 D. capensis Purcell, 1904 (type) — South Africa
 D. dippenaarae Haddad, 2015 — South Africa
 D. karooica Haddad, 2015 — Namibia, South Africa
 D. major Lawrence, 1928 — Namibia, Botswana, South Africa
 D. proxila Haddad, 2015 — South Africa

I

Iraponia

Iraponia Kranz-Baltensperger, Platnick & Dupérré, 2009
 I. scutata Kranz-Baltensperger, Platnick & Dupérré, 2009 (type) — Iran

L

Laoponia

Laoponia Platnick & Jäger, 2008
 L. pseudosaetosa Liu, Li & Pham, 2010 — Vietnam
 L. saetosa Platnick & Jäger, 2008 (type) — China, Laos, Vietnam

M

Medionops

Medionops Sánchez-Ruiz & Brescovit, 2017
 M. blades Sánchez-Ruiz & Brescovit, 2017 (type) — Colombia
 M. cesari (Dupérré, 2014) — Ecuador
 M. claudiae Sánchez-Ruiz & Brescovit, 2017 — Brazil
 M. murici Sánchez-Ruiz & Brescovit, 2017 — Brazil
 M. ramirezi Sánchez-Ruiz & Brescovit, 2017 — Brazil
 M. simla (Chickering, 1967) — Panama, Trinidad
 M. tabay Sánchez-Ruiz & Brescovit, 2017 — Venezuela

N

Nasutonops

Nasutonops Brescovit & Sánchez-Ruiz, 2016
 N. chapeu Brescovit & Sánchez-Ruiz, 2016 — Brazil
 N. sincora Brescovit & Sánchez-Ruiz, 2016 — Brazil
 N. xaxado Brescovit & Sánchez-Ruiz, 2016 (type) — Brazil

Nops

Nops MacLeay, 1839
 N. agnarssoni Sánchez-Ruiz, Brescovit & Alayón, 2015 — Puerto Rico
 N. alexenriquei Sánchez-Ruiz & Brescovit, 2018 — Brazil
 N. amazonas Sánchez-Ruiz & Brescovit, 2018 — Brazil
 N. anisitsi Strand, 1909 — Paraguay
 N. bahia Sánchez-Ruiz & Brescovit, 2018 — Brazil
 N. bellulus Chamberlin, 1916 — Peru
 N. blandus (Bryant, 1942) — Virgin Is. (US and UK)
 N. branicki (Taczanowski, 1874) — French Guiana
 N. campeche Sánchez-Ruiz & Brescovit, 2018 — Mexico, Belize, Costa Rica
 N. coccineus Simon, 1892 — Saint Vincent and the Grenadines (St. Vincent)
 N. enae Sánchez-Ruiz, 2004 — Cuba
 N. ernestoi Sánchez-Ruiz, 2005 — Hispaniola (Dominican Rep.)
 N. farhati Prosen, 1949 — Argentina
 N. finisfurvus Sánchez-Ruiz, Brescovit & Alayón, 2015 — Virgin Is. (UK), Puerto Rico (Culebra Is.)
 N. flutillus Chickering, 1967 — Curaçao
 N. gertschi Chickering, 1967 — Hispaniola (Dominican Rep.)
 N. glaucus Hasselt, 1887 — Netherlands Antilles (Bonaire)
 N. guanabacoae MacLeay, 1839 (type) — Cuba, Bahamas
 N. hispaniola Sánchez-Ruiz, Brescovit & Alayón, 2015 — Hispaniola (Haiti, Dominican Rep.)
 N. ipojuca Sánchez-Ruiz & Brescovit, 2018 — Brazil
 N. itapetinga Sánchez-Ruiz & Brescovit, 2018 — Brazil
 N. jaragua Sánchez-Ruiz & Brescovit, 2018 — Dominican Rep.
 N. largus Chickering, 1967 — Panama
 N. maculatus Simon, 1893 — Venezuela, Trinidad, Guyana
 N. mathani Simon, 1893 — Brazil
 N. meridionalis Keyserling, 1891 — Brazil
 N. minas Sánchez-Ruiz & Brescovit, 2018 — Brazil
 N. navassa Sánchez-Ruiz & Brescovit, 2018 — Navassa Is. (Haiti or USA)
 N. nitidus Simon, 1907 — Brazil
 N. pallidus Sánchez-Ruiz & Brescovit, 2018 — Cuba
 N. pocone Sánchez-Ruiz & Brescovit, 2018 — Brazil
 N. quito Dupérré, 2014 — Ecuador
 N. siboney Sánchez-Ruiz, 2004 — Cuba
 N. sublaevis Simon, 1893 — Venezuela
 N. tico Sánchez-Ruiz & Brescovit, 2018 — Costa Rica, Panama
 N. toballus Chickering, 1967 — Jamaica
 N. ursumus Chickering, 1967 — Panama
 N. variabilis Keyserling, 1877 — Colombia, Venezuela
 † N. lobatus Wunderlich, 1988

Nopsides

Nopsides Chamberlin, 1924
 N. ceralbonus Chamberlin, 1924 (type) — Mexico, possibly Peru

Nopsma

Nopsma Sánchez-Ruiz, Brescovit & Bonaldo, 2020
 N. armandoi Sánchez-Ruiz, Brescovit & Bonaldo, 2020 — Nicaragua
 N. enriquei Sánchez-Ruiz, Brescovit & Bonaldo, 2020 — Peru
 N. florencia Sánchez-Ruiz, Brescovit & Bonaldo, 2020 — Colombia
 N. juchuy (Dupérré, 2014) (type) — Ecuador

Notnops

Notnops Platnick, 1994
 N. calderoni Platnick, 1994 (type) — Chile

Nyetnops

Nyetnops Platnick & Lise, 2007
 N. buruti Sánchez-Ruiz, Brescovit & Bonaldo, 2020 — Brazil
 N. guarani Platnick & Lise, 2007 (type) — Brazil
 N. lachonta Sánchez-Ruiz, Brescovit & Bonaldo, 2020 — Bolivia
 N. naylienae Sánchez-Ruiz, Brescovit & Bonaldo, 2020 — Peru

O

Orthonops

Orthonops Chamberlin, 1924
Orthonops confuso (Galán-Sánchez & Álvarez-Padilla, 2022) – Mexico
Orthonops gertschi Chamberlin, 1928 – USA
Orthonops giulianii Platnick, 1995 – USA
Orthonops icenoglei Platnick, 1995 – USA, Mexico
Orthonops iviei Platnick, 1995 – USA
Orthonops johnsoni Platnick, 1995 – USA
Orthonops lapanus Gertsch & Mulaik, 1940 – USA
Orthonops ovalis (Banks, 1898) – Mexico
Orthonops overtus Chamberlin, 1924 (type) – Mexico
Orthonops zebra Platnick, 1995 – USA

T

Taintnops

Taintnops Platnick, 1994
 T. goloboffi Platnick, 1994 (type) — Chile
 T. paposo Brescovit & Sánchez-Ruiz, 2016 — Chile

Tarsonops

Tarsonops Chamberlin, 1924
 T. ariguanabo (Alayón, 1986) — Cuba, Panama
 T. clavis Chamberlin, 1924 — Mexico
 T. coronilla Sánchez-Ruiz & Brescovit, 2015 — Mexico
 T. irataylori Bond & Taylor, 2013 — Belize
 T. sectipes Chamberlin, 1924 (type) — Mexico
 T. sternalis (Banks, 1898) — Mexico
 T. systematicus Chamberlin, 1924 — Mexico

Tisentnops

Tisentnops Platnick, 1994
 T. leopoldi (Zapfe, 1962) (type) — Chile
 T. mineiro Brescovit & Sánchez-Ruiz, 2016 — Brazil
 T. onix Brescovit & Sánchez-Ruiz, 2016 — Brazil

References

Caponiidae